A Bürgermeisterpfennig is a small silver coin that was issued in Hamburg after the death of a Mayor of Hamburg on the occasion of his funeral and which depicted the coat of arms as well as the biographical information and dates of office of the deceased mayor.

History 
In older times it was customary in Hamburg, at the funeral of a mayor, to distribute small coins worth a quarter of a thaler to the students who were singing ahead of the hearse and perhaps to others in the funeral procession. The family of Mayor Johann Schrött, who died in 1676, first had the idea of having their own coin minted for this purpose. On the next few occasions, however, this example was not followed; instead twelve schilling pieces were handed out again. It was not until 1697, when Mayor Johann Schulte died, that his family had his own pfennig minted again. After that, the tradition was continued. At first they were content to mint them from 1/2 Lot of thaler silver; in later times, however, they were made of fine silver and varied in weight according to how wealthy and generous the deceased's family was. Several Bürgermeisterpfennigs have become quite valuable and there are also isolated cases where several coins of different weights and sizes were made at the same time. The smaller ones were distributed, for example, to the students, the larger ones to persons of higher rank.

In more recent times, there has been a move away from large, ceremonial funeral processions, so there has been no distribution of gifts to students and other mourners, and it has been sufficient to distribute the pfennigs to members of the Hamburg Senate, Hamburg College of Elders and to the relatives and friends of the deceased. The mayors received golden specimens, which is why they also appear every now and then, albeit very rarely. As a rule, they depict the family crest of the deceased with their name, dates of birth, election and death on the obverse and emblems or allusions to their character and merits on the reverse. In more recent times a bust portrait has often been incorporated.

List of Bürgermeisterpfennigs

References

Literature 
 Franklin Kopitzsch, Daniel Tilgner (eds.): Hamburg-Lexikon. 2. durchgesehene Auflage. Zeise, Hamburg 2000, ISBN 3-9805687-9-2.
 Johann Paul Langermann: Hamburgisches Münz- und Medaillen-Vergnügen oder Abbildung und Beschreibung Hamburgischer Münzen und Medaillen. Hamburg 1753.
 Verein für Hamburgische Geschichte (publ.): Hamburgische Münzen und Medaillen. 3 vols. Meißner, Hamburg 1850–1876.

Coins of Germany
History of Hamburg